"Have a Party" is the first single from rap group Mobb Deep's 2006 album Blood Money, and is also the fourth single from soundtrack of the film Get Rich Or Die Tryin'. It is a hip hop song, and is also their debut single with G-Unit Records. The song features 50 Cent and Nate Dogg on the chorus.

Background
The track samples "I Love Rock 'n' Roll" by Joan Jett & The Blackhearts.

Music video
The music video starts with three girls winning an invitation to the G-Unit mansion after purchasing the CD single. At their home, they listen to Funkmaster Flex on the radio and leave afterwards for Fifty's mansion. Cameo appearances are made by G-Unit artists Young Buck, Lloyd Banks, Tony Yayo & Spider Loc.

Chart performance
Released in 2006 the single reached 49 on the Hot R&B/Hip-Hop Songs and 23 on the Hot Rap Tracks.

Chart positions

References

2006 songs
Mobb Deep songs
Songs written by 50 Cent
Songs written by Nate Dogg
G-Unit Records singles
Interscope Records singles
Songs written by Prodigy (rapper)
Songs written by Havoc (musician)
Songs written by Fredwreck
Song recordings produced by Fredwreck